Adiós muchachos may refer to:

Adiós muchachos (tango), classic tango song by Julio César Sanders and César Felipe Vedani
Adiós muchachos, 1994 novel by Daniel Chavarría
Adiós muchachos, political memoir by Sergio Ramírez 1999
Adiós muchachos (film) 1955